Taban Air (Hevapimaii-ye Taban), officially known as Taban Airlines, is an airline headquartered in the Ekbatan Complex in Tehran, Iran, with its main operational base in Mashhad. It operates international, domestic, and charter routes as a scheduled carrier.

History 
The airline was established in 2005 and started operations in 2006. Taban Air was founded by Captain Asghar Abdollahpour.

Destinations

Fleet

Current fleet
The Taban Air fleet consists of the following aircraft as of August 2019:

Former fleet

Incidents and accidents
On 24 January 2010, Taban Air Flight 6437, a Tupolev Tu-154, crashed whilst making an emergency landing at Mashhad International Airport due to a medical emergency; all 157 and 13 crew survived the accident with 42 receiving minor injuries.

References

External links

Taban Air
Taban Air 
Taban Air fleet

 
Airlines of Iran
Airlines established in 2005
Iranian brands
Iranian companies established in 2005